The Choice Is Yours or Choice Is Yours may refer to:
1980 – The Choice Is Yours, an album by punk rock band The Members
 "The Choice Is Yours (Revisited)", a song by hip hop group Black Sheep
 Choice Is Yours (AAA album), the third mini album by the Japanese entertainers AAA
 The Choice is Yours, a high school open enrollment program coordinated by the Minnesota Department of Education